The discography of Nigerian rapper Falz includes four studio albums, one mixtape, one EP and numerous singles.

Falz began his career with the release of Shakara: The Mixtape in 2009. He released his debut album Wazup Guy in 2014, to critical acclaim. His second album Stories That Touch was released in 2015, to further acclaim.

He released his debut collaborative extended play Chemistry with singer Simi. In 2017 on his 27th birthday, he released his third studio album 27 as a surprise album.

On January 15, 2019, he released his fourth studio album and his most commercially successful yet Moral Instruction.

Albums

Studio albums

Mixtapes
 Shakara: The Mixtape (2009)

EPs

Selected singles

References 

Hip hop discographies